Carreg Coetan Arthur is a neolithic dolmen near Newport in North Pembrokeshire, Wales.

Carreg Coetan Arthur dates from around 3000 BC and is the remains of a Neolithic burial chamber (also known as a quoit).

The remains consist of a 4-metre-long capstone on smaller supporting rocks. It would have originally been earth covered, but this has eroded away.

The site is managed by Cadw and it is a scheduled ancient monument.

Notes

External links

Carreg Coetan Arthur on NewportPembs.co.uk
Carreg Coetan Arthur at Pembrokeshire Virtual Museum
Carreg Coetan Arthur on the Megalithic Portal

3rd-millennium BC architecture
Prehistoric sites in Pembrokeshire
Dolmens in Wales
Buildings and structures in Pembrokeshire
Tourist attractions in Pembrokeshire
Cadw
Monuments and memorials in Pembrokeshire